David Morisset (born April 6, 1981) is a Canadian former professional ice hockey forward who played briefly in the National Hockey League for the Florida Panthers.

Playing career
As a youth, Morriset played in the 1994 Quebec International Pee-Wee Hockey Tournament with a minor ice hockey team from Langley, British Columbia.

Morriset was selected by the St. Louis Blues in the second round, 65th overall, in the 2000 NHL Entry Draft. Morisset played major junior hockey in the Western Hockey League for the Seattle Thunderbirds when his NHL rights were traded by the Blues to the Florida Panthers in exchange for Scott Mellanby. Morriset made his professional debut in the 2001–02 season with the Bridgeport Sound Tigers of the American Hockey League before he was recalled to the Panthers to make his NHL debut and feature in four games. Morisset retired from professional hockey after an attempted return from injury with the Idaho Steelheads of the ECHL in 2005.

Career statistics

Regular season and playoffs

International

References

External links

1981 births
Living people
Bridgeport Sound Tigers players
Canadian ice hockey right wingers
Ice hockey people from British Columbia
Idaho Steelheads (ECHL) players
Florida Panthers players
St. Louis Blues draft picks
San Antonio Rampage players
Seattle Thunderbirds players